Chekhov is a town and the administrative center of Chekhovsky District in Moscow Oblast, Russia. Population:    56,000 (1985).

It was previously known as Lopasnya (until 1954).

History
Originally named Lopasnya, after the Lopasnya River, it was granted town status and given its present name in 1954 in honor of writer Anton Chekhov.
Germany took Lopasnya from 23 11 to 17 12 1941.

Administrative and municipal status
Within the framework of administrative divisions, Chekhov serves as the administrative center of Chekhovsky District. As an administrative division, it is incorporated within Chekhovsky District as the Town of Chekhov. As a municipal division, the Town of Chekhov is incorporated within Chekhovsky Municipal District as Chekhov Urban Settlement.

Military
Near Chekhov is the Russian General Staff wartime command post, buried deep underground.

Religion
On the outskirts of Chekhov lies the Davidov Hermitage, reputedly the richest monastery in Russia. It contains many churches from the 17th and 18th centuries.

Twin towns and sister cities

Chekhov is twinned with:
 Fastiv (Ukraine) (before the 2022 Russian invasion of Ukraine)
 Kapyl (Belarus)
 Krasnohvardiiske Raion (Ukraine) (before the 2022 Russian invasion of Ukraine)
 Ochamchira District (Abkhazia/Georgia)
 Pazardzhik (Bulgaria)
 Saratoga Springs (United States)

References

Notes

Sources

External links
Official website of Chekhov 
Chekhov Business Directory 

Cities and towns in Moscow Oblast
Chekhovsky District